Lorna Frampton (2 April 1920 – 23 February 2009) was an English backstroke swimmer who competed for Great Britain in the 1936 Summer Olympics in Berlin, where she finished sixth in the women's 100-metre backstroke event.

At the 1938 British Empire Games in Sydney, she was a member of the English women's team that won the gold medal in the 3×110-yard medley relay event.

External links
Lorna Frampton's profile at Sports Reference.com
Notice of Lorna Frampton's death

1920 births
2009 deaths
English female swimmers
Olympic swimmers of Great Britain
Swimmers at the 1936 Summer Olympics
Swimmers at the 1938 British Empire Games
Commonwealth Games gold medallists for England
Commonwealth Games medallists in swimming
Medallists at the 1938 British Empire Games